The Road to Indy Presented by Cooper Tires is a racecar driver development program, providing a scholarship-funded path to reach the IndyCar Series and Indianapolis 500. Sanctioned by IndyCar, the Road to Indy is owned and managed by Andersen Promotions. On December 9, 2010 it was announced that Mazda would become the title sponsor of the program and provide scholarships for series champions to advance to the next rung of the ladder with all three series running on Cooper Tires.

Since its launch in 2010, the Road to Indy ladder system has attracted competitors from around the globe. Drivers from Argentina, Australia, Brazil, Canada, China, Colombia, Denmark, Finland, France, Guatemala, Guyana, India, Ireland, Italy, Korea, Mexico, Netherlands, New Zealand, Norway, Philippines, Singapore, Sweden, South Africa, Spain, United Kingdom, Venezuela and Zimbabwe have been part of the grids, showcasing their talents at premier venues on a mix of road courses, temporary street circuits and ovals. 

Participating series (in order from lowest to highest "rung"):

In 2021 Kyle Kirkwood won the Indy Lights championship and became the first driver to win a championship and thus scholarship at every rung of the ladder on their way to Indycar. However, both Sage Karam and Matthew Brabham won scholarships from U.S. F2000 and made it to IndyCar. Karam, Brabham, Tristan Vautier, Oliver Askew and Spencer Pigot have all won two scholarships on their way to IndyCar. In 2017, Josef Newgarden became the first Road to Indy graduate and scholarship winner to win the IndyCar Series championship.

Mazda Road to Indy Shootout
For 2017 a shootout race for up and coming talents was announced. The Road to Indy has several partnerships with other development series. In a knock-out format the drivers will compete for a $200,000.00 scholarship to race in the USF2000 series.

Drivers from the following series can qualify to compete in the shootout:

  Atlantic Championship Series (2016)
  Australian Formula Ford (2016–present)
  BRSCC Formula Ford 1600 (2016–present)
  MSVR Formula Ford Super Series (2016–present) 
  F1600 Formula F Championship (2016–present) 
  F2000 Championship Series (2016-present) 
  Formula Car Challenge Presented by Goodyear (2016–present)
  Formula Ford Festival (2017–present)
  Formula Panam (2016–present)
  Formula Tour 1600 (2016–present) 
  MMSC 1600 Indian Championship (2016–present)
  NACAM Formula 4 Championship (starting in 2018)
  New Zealand Formula Ford Championship (2016–present)
  Northern Ireland Formula Ford 1600 Championship (2017–present)
  Pacific F2000 (2016–present) 
  Rotax Max Challenge (USA)(2016)
  SCCA Runoffs – F1600 (2016–present)
  SCCA Runoffs – FC (2016–present)
  Scottish Motor Racing Club Formula Ford 1600 Championship (2016–present) 
  Selectiva de Kart Petrobras (2017–present)
  Skip Barber Race Series (2016)
  Team USA Scholarship (2016–present) 
  Walter Hayes Trophy (2017–present) 
  Mazda Road to Indy Brazil (2016)

Shootout winners

Champions

References

 
IndyCar Series